Bruce Hudson may refer to:

 Bruce Hudson (soccer) (born 1950), American soccer forward
 Bruce Hudson (curler) (1928–2016), Canadian curler
 , an oil tanker